David Wandendeya Wakikona is a Ugandan aviator and politician, who  previously served in the Cabinet of Uganda  as State Minister for Northern Uganda (2 June 2006 until 27 May 2011) and State Minister of Trade & Antiquities (May 2011 to June 2016). He was also the elected Member of Parliament representing Manjiya County in Bududa District from 2001 until 2016.

Background and education
He was born in Bududa District on 26 November 1950. In 1971, he obtained a commercial pilot license from the East African Civil Aviation Authority, then based at the Soroti Airport. In 1993, he was awarded the Diploma in Flight Operations from CASI in Beirut. The following year, he received the Diploma in Government Operations from the same institution. In 1995, the International Aviation Management Training Institute in Canada, awarded him the Diploma in Aviation Management. In 1999, he received the degree of Bachelor of Arts in Aviation from the University of Western Sydney in Australia. In 2007 he was awarded the degree of Bachelor of Arts in Public Administration & Management by Nkumba University.

Work experience
From 1991 until 1992, Wakikona served as the Chief Licensing & Flight Inspection Officer for the Civil Aviation Authority of Uganda. From 1993 until 1998, he served as the Director of the East African Civil Aviation Academy, also known as the Soroti Flying School, in Soroti, Eastern Uganda. From 1999 until 2000, he served as the General Manager of Uganda Air Cargo, a government-owned cargo airline. In 2001, he joined politics, contesting the parliamentary seat of Manjiya County in Bududa District. He won, and was re-elected in 2006 and again in 2011. On 1 June 2006, he was appointed State Minister for Northern Uganda in the Office of the Prime Minister, a position he maintained until May 2011. In the cabinet reshuffle of 27 May 2011, he was moved as State Minister to the Trade & Antiquities portfolio.  He replaced Gagawala Wambuzi in that role, who was dropped from the Cabinet.

In the run-up to the 2016 general election, Wakikona was defeated by John Baptist Nambeshe in the National Resistance Movement primary for Manjiya County, and consequently he did not contest the election. Following the election, in June 2016 Wakikona was replaced as State Minister for Trade by Michael Werikhe Kafabusa.

Personal life
Wakikona was widowed in 2017. He belongs to the National Resistance Movement political party. He is reported to have special interest in current affairs and soccer.

See also
 Parliament of Uganda
 Bududa District

References

External links
 Website of the Parliament of Uganda
Full Ministerial Cabinet List, February 2009

1950 births
Living people
People from Bududa District
Members of the Parliament of Uganda
Government ministers of Uganda
National Resistance Movement politicians
Ugandan aviators
Nkumba University alumni
Western Sydney University alumni
People from Eastern Region, Uganda
Commercial aviators
21st-century Ugandan politicians